Anyone Who Had a Heart is the title of the second album by the American singer Dionne Warwick, released in 1964 on the Scepter label. It was produced by Burt Bacharach and Hal David.

History
The album is notable for including the title track, which became Warick's first top ten hit on the Billboard Hot 100. Also featured are three tracks which appeared on her first album, Presenting Dionne Warwick issued the year before:  "Don't Make Me Over", '"This Empty Place", and "I Cry Alone". These three tracks are exactly identical to the versions on the previous album, and are not different takes or remixes. The album was digitally remastered and reissued on CD on November 29, 2011, by Collectables Records.

Track listing

Personnel
 Bob Fisher: Mastering
 Richie Unterberger: Liner Notes
 Dionne Warwick: Vocals

Singles

 From November 30, 1963, to January 23, 1965, Billboard Magazine did not publish a Hot R&B Songs chart.  The peak positions for R&B singles listed during this period are from Cash Box Magazine R&B Songs chart.

References

External links
Anyone Who Had a Heart at Discogs

1964 albums
Dionne Warwick albums
Albums produced by Burt Bacharach
Albums produced by Hal David
Scepter Records albums